Miss Independent may refer to:

 "Miss Independent" (Kelly Clarkson song), 2003
 Miss Independent (video), a 2003 DVD album by Clarkson 
 "Miss Independent" (Ne-Yo song), 2008
 "Miss Independent" (Maluma song), 2013